The 2007 Inter-Korean summit meeting was held between October 2 and October 4, 2007, in Pyongyang, between President Roh Moo-hyun of the Republic of Korea and Kim Jong-il of the Democratic People's Republic of Korea (DPRK). It is the second Inter-Korean summit following the 2000 inter-Korean summit. It is also called the 10.4 Inter-Korean summit. As a result of the talks, both sides announced a declaration for the development of inter-Korean relations and peace and prosperity.

Overview 
The second Summit was held October 2–4, 2007, also in Pyongyang, between Kim Jong-il and Roh Moo-hyun, at the time President of the Republic of Korea. This summit occurred in light of the recent partially successful detonation of a nuclear device by North Korea, the development of which violated a range of guarantees, given in exchange for aid, that North Korea would cease nuclear weapon development.  This summit probably occurred due to concerted political and economic pressure from a number of major states (such as the United States, South Korea, and Japan) and in particular from China, which is the nearest state North Korea has as an ally, and which provides North Korea with the oil and food supplies that keep the country from totally collapsing.

Details 
On August 8, 2007, the Republic of Korea (South Korea) and the Democratic People's Republic of Korea (North Korea) announced that the second Inter-Korean summit would be held from August 28 to August 30, 2007.

However, on August 18, 2007, North Korea postponed the talks due to flooding. South Korea proposed to hold Summit talks between October 2 and October 4, 2007.

On October 2, 2007, at 9:05, South Korean president Roh Moo-hyun walked across the Korean Demilitarized Zone in travelling to Pyongyang for talks with Kim Jong-il. Unlike in the first summit, President Roh reached the summit location via the land routes – Kaesung and Pyongyang Expressway. During the visit, there was a series of meetings and discussions between the leaders.

The June 15th North–South Joint Declaration that the two leaders signed during the first South–North summit stated that they would hold the second summit at an appropriate time. It was originally thought in 2000 that the second summit would be held in South Korea, but that did not prove to be the case in 2007.

At the meetings and talks, the two sides reaffirmed the spirit of the June 15th North–South Joint Declaration and had discussions on various issues related to realizing the advancement of South–North relations, peace on the Korean Peninsula, common prosperity of the Korean people and unification of Korea. On October 4, 2007, Roh and Kim signed the peace declaration. The document called for international talks to replace the armistice which ended the Korean War with a permanent peace treaty.

Gifts
 Kim Jong-il gave his presidential guest Roh Moo-hyun four tonnes of prized songi (matsutake mushrooms) worth up to US$2.6 million at their summit. A kilogram of these mushrooms, which is a Korean delicacy, can sell for as much as 600,000 won (US$656) in South Korean stores. Kim Jong-il had 500 boxes of the mushrooms trucked to the border for President Roh to take back after their three-day summit. This was similar to the first summit when Kim Jong-il gave South Korea's then-president Kim Dae-jung three tonnes of the same mushrooms.
 Roh Moo-hyun had first given Kim Jong-il a collection of South Korean films and television dramas which included his favorite actress Elizabeth Taylor, normally banned in the North, as well as a painted folding screen and a fine tea set.

Uncertain South Korean transcript
A transcript of the summit talks was not placed in the South Korean national archives, which led to later disputes about what exactly was said in discussions. In June 2013, to resolve a dispute, the National Intelligence Service stated its copy of the final transcript recorded that President Roh had said "I agree with [leader Kim Jong-il] that the Northern Limit Line should be changed."

Legacy

See also
 2000 Inter-Korean summit
 Sunshine Policy

Footnotes

References
The Second Inter-Korean summit: Four Arguments Against and Why They Could Be Wrong (quoted by nautilus.org)
Ban Ki-moon welcomes forthcoming Inter-Korean summit
Inter-Korean summit welcome
Looking forward to new aspect of Inter-Korean summit
the eight-point agreement by the leaders of the two Koreas at the end of their summit (quoted by koreanblog.com)
2nd South-North Korean Summit Joint Statement, The Institute for Far Eastern Studies, Kyungnam University

External links

The Inter-Korean summit:Evaluation and Tasks Ahead
The Inter-Korean summit and Unification Formulae
Landmark Inter-Korean summit begins with unification pledge
The official homepage of 2007 Inter-Korean summit
The official website of the Republic of Korea
Inter-Korean dialogue

Press releases
Two Koreas to hold summit (CNN, Aug 7, 2007)
New hope of inter-Korean detente (UPI, Aug 10, 2007) 
Inter-Korean summit (chinaview, Aug 8, 2007)
Korean summit postponed by floods (CNN, Aug 18, 2007)

Politics of Korea
2007 in North Korea
2007 in South Korea
2007 in Korea
2007 in international relations
North Korea–South Korea relations
Kim Jong-il